Samrat Prithviraj is a 2022 Indian Hindi-language historical action drama film directed by Chandraprakash Dwivedi and produced by Yash Raj Films. The film is based on Prithviraj Raso, a Braj language epic poem about the life of Prithviraj Chauhan, a Rajput king from the Chahamana dynasty. It features Akshay Kumar as the titular character, while Manushi Chhillar makes her Hindi film debut playing the role of Sanyogita. The film also stars Sanjay Dutt, Sonu Sood, Manav Vij, Ashutosh Rana and Sakshi Tanwar in other pivotal roles.

An official motion poster of the film was released by Yash Raj Films on 9 September 2019, revealing its release in cinemas on Diwali 2020. Principal photography began in Jaipur on 15 November 2019, but was suspended in March 2020 owing to COVID-19 pandemic in India, due to which the film was indefinitely postponed. The film's shoot resumed in October 2020 at YRF Studios. Originally titled  Prithviraj, the film was renamed as Samrat Prithviraj following a court litigation a week ahead of its scheduled release. The film was released on 3 June 2022.

The film received mixed reviews from critics.

Plot
In 1192 CE in Ghazni, Afghanistan Prithviraj is captured by Muhammad Ghori where he forces him to fight against three lions. A blinded Prithviraj is able to kill all of them but faints due to weakness.

The story then shifts back a few years before in Kannauj where princess Sanyogita, Jayachand's daughter is in love with Prithviraj Chauhan who is ruling Ajmer. In Ajmer, Prithviraj is approached by Mir Hossain who is the brother of Ghori. Ghori and Hossain were brothers, but a rift occurred between them because Hossain ran with Chitralekha, a dancer in Ghori's kingdom, as both loved each other. Prithviraj ensures Hossain that he will help him and takes him in his kingdom. This act angers Ghori and he decides to attack Ajmer if Prithviraj does not send Hossain back to him. Ghori sends Qutb al-Din Aibak to Ajmer. Prithviraj rejects Ghori's demand. As Aibak warns him, Prithviraj accepts the demand for a war. This results in the First Battle of Tarain where Prithviraj along with Kaka Kanha, Chand Bardai and his men are able to defeat Ghori 's army, but Mir Hossain is killed in the battle. Meanwhile, Ghori is captured by Prithviraj, but after few days he is released.

Prithviraj Chauhan is selected as ruler of Delhi. This angers Jayachand. He warns that the consequences of this act will not be good. Jayachand decides to organize a Svayamvara for Sanyogita and Rajasuya Yagya to increase his empire. He also sends an invitation to Prithviraj, asking 50 per cent control on Delhi, which Prithviraj rejects. Jayachand decides to make a statue of Prithviraj on the doorway of his empire, as he had rejected the invitation and as per the rituals if someone rejects the invitation a statue can fill the position of that person. As the svayamvara starts, Sanyogita decides to put the varmala on Prithviraj's statue. This angers Jayachand. He decides to punish his daughter, but soon Prithviraj approaches with his army and takes Sanyogita as she had chosen Prithviraj as her husband. A furious Jayachand decides to attack Prithviraj but is stopped by his advisors. Soon Prithviraj and Sanyogita get married according to the rituals. After a few days, Jayachand sends his army to attack other forts under Prithviraj. Soon his army captures Gaudpur Fort. While Prithviraj, Sanyogita, Chand Bardai and others are outside, Kaka Kanha along with Prithviraj's army decide to recapture Gaudpur fort. They are successful in recapturing the fort, but Kaka Kanha and many other men of Chauhan are killed in the battle. Prithviraj decides to attack Jayachand, but soon reverses the decision, as Kaka Kanha's last wish for Prithviraj was to forgive Jayachand. Later, Prithviraj decides to give equal position to Sanyogita in his darbar. This decision is opposed by other darbar members, but soon Prithviraj manages to get their approval by telling them about the importance of women in society.

Jayachand decides to contact Muhammad Ghori through a merchant and asks him to capture Prithviraj. In exchange, he will handover anything Ghori wants. Ghori sends Aibak to Delhi. Aibak asks Prithviraj to work under Ghori's rule or he should prepare for another war. Prithviraj accepts the offer of war with Ghori. This results in the Second battle of Tarain. As the battle continues, Ghori's army decreases. Ghori then decides to attack Prithviraj during night when his army is sleeping. Ghori's army is successful in defeating Prithviraj's army and captures Prithviraj, taking him back to Ghazni. As Ghori's army is approaching to Delhi, Sanyogita and other Rajput women perform jauhar (mass suicide by immolation). Ghori refuses to give Prithviraj to Jayachand, thus leaving him in pain and awe for the loss of Ajmer and his daughter.

Delhi is now ruled by Ghori's men. As Prithviraj was captured by Ghori, Ghori asks his men to remove Prithviraj's eyes thus making him blind. Prithviraj is forced to fight with lions, but soon defeats them. He then asks Ghori that if anyone wants to attack him he should first call his name to attack and Chand Bardai should be allowed to help him through his words and poems. Soon Prithviraj faints. The next day, the blind Prithviraj is given 7 chances to save his life along with his army's. Ghori's men conclude that Prithviraj will be given 7 arrows along with a bow and if he is able to kill one men out of a group 7 then he will be released. Prithviraj rejects the offer and asks Ghori that he should be given only one chance, with one arrow and Ghori himself should come face to face to kill him. Ghori accepts the condition and faces Prithviraj on the battlefield. As Ghori was approaching, Chand Bardai recites a poem to Prithviraj. Inspired through the poem Prithviraj then shoots an arrow into the neck of Muhammad Ghori, instantly killing him. Chand Bardai jumps to Prithviraj to hug him, but both are killed by arrows shot by Ghori's men. Prithviraj's men are released from the prison as per the condition. Prithviraj's men take the dead bodies of Chauhan and Bardai to perform the final rites.

The film ends with a note informing that Prithviraj Chauhan was the last Hindu ruler of Delhi before the Islamic Conquest on Hindustan. As India became independent in 1947, Prithviraj Chauhan's death was justified through freedom.

Cast

Production

Development
Samrat Prithviraj is primarily based on Prithviraj Raso, a Braj language epic poem about the life of Prithviraj Chauhan, a king from the Chahamana dynasty. Chandraprakash Dwivedi had completed script for Prithviraj in 2010, and his first choice for Prithviraj's role was Sunny Deol, with Aishwarya Rai as Sanyogita. However, due to Deol's date issues and no production house interest, he left the project and it was almost shelved, but Dwivedi wanted to still make Prithviraj and after struggling for many years in finding a producer to come on board for him, Yash Raj Films offered to produce the film in 2018, thus reviving the film.

In March 2019, Akshay Kumar confirmed that he had been persuaded to star as Prithviraj. The film's official announcement was made on Kumar's 52nd birthday (9 September 2019), with a motion poster released on social media.

Casting
It was rumoured in the media before the announcement of the film that Sanjay Dutt would be joining in a film with Akshay Kumar. In September 2019, after the announcement of the film was made, Dutt confirmed that he would be joining Prithviraj. Manav Vij has been cast for the role Mohammed Ghori. In November 2019, Manushi Chhillar was confirmed to play the role of Sanyogita, Prithviraj's love interest, making her Bollywood debut and replacing Rai. Later, Sonu Sood and Sakshi Tanwar also joined the cast. It also stars Lalit Tiwari, Ajoy Chakraborty and Govind Pandey in supporting roles.

Filming

Principal photography commenced on 15 November 2019 with a puja ceremony at Jamwaramgarh, Jaipur, Rajasthan, and a song was shot in January 2020, but the filming was stopped in March 2020 due to the Coronavirus lockdown in India ordered by the Indian government, owing to the COVID-19 pandemic.

Ahead of the 2020 monsoon season, the sets created in Rajasthan were taken down because the cost of maintaining them during the coronavirus lockdown was too high. With no filming expected to take place before the monsoon season, the two sets erected in Dahisar – one of a palace and one of an arena made for an action sequence – were destroyed. Instead, an indoor set was decided to be set up for resumption of filming.

After 6 months, shooting was resumed at YRF Studios in October 2020. Kumar was spotted at the sets on 10 October 2020, while Sood and Chhillar were a part of this schedule too. Filming wrapped up in February 2021.

Different news sites have reported different budget with values ranging between  — .

Release

Certification
The Indian censor board gave the film U/A certificate. Films certified U/A contain moderate adult themes, that is not strong in nature and can be watched by a child below 12 years of age under parental guidance. The censor board demanded five cuts and adjustments. The committee examining the film asked a disclaimer to clarify that the people associated with the film did not support or promote Johar (Jauhar), Sati or any other similar activity. Some of the words in the dialogues were changed. The Hindi word haran (translation: abduct) was replaced with waran (select); Nana  with sage; kabza (occupation) with hamla (attack);  and antim (last)  with mahaan (great).

Litigations 
In February 2022, the Delhi High Court dismissed a public interest litigation (PIL) filed by Rashtriya Pravasi Parishad, after the petitioner asked for a withdrawal. The petitioner sought to change the name of the film from Prithviraj to Great Emperor Prithviraj Chauhan, claiming that using Prithviraj Chauhan's name without prefixes is disrespectful.

In March 2022, the organization Karni Sena started protesting against the film, seeking assurance from the makers that the film would not tamper the historic facts. On 27 May 2022, the title of the film was changed from Prithviraj to Samrat Prithviraj due to PIL issued by Karni Sena.

Gurjar Samaj Sarv Sangthan Sabha Ekta Samanya Samiti, a Gurjar organisation, sued the film makers in the Delhi High Court and alleged that the film depicted Prithviraj as a Rajput king, and claimed that he was rather a Gurjar king. The petitioners said that the film is based on Prithviraj Raso, which states Chauhan as a Gurjar king. The petitioners also submitted Wikipedia article about the movie, among others, as an evidence. They claimed that Prithviraj's portrayal as a Rajput would hurt the sentiments of Gurjar community. The film makers responded that the film is caste neutral and does not depict Chauhan as a Gurjar or a Rajput; but portrays him as an Indian warrior and king. The petitioners stated that their grievance was resolved if the film is caste neutral. The court said that the filmmakers were bound by their statement in the court and then disposed off the plea.

Theatrical release 
The film was earlier announced for cinema release on 13 November 2020, coinciding with Diwali. However, it was postponed due to production halt between March to October 2020 due to the COVID-19 pandemic. The film was scheduled to release in theatres on 21 January 2022 in 2D and IMAX, but postponed due to spread of Omicron variant. Finally, film was theatrically released on 3 June 2022 in Hindi and dubbed versions of Tamil and Telugu languages only.

The film's release was banned in Kuwait and Oman. In Qatar the release was put on hold.

Prior to the release, the film was declared tax-free in Uttar Pradesh, Madhya Pradesh, Gujarat and Uttarakhand.

Home media
The film was digitally streamed on Amazon Prime Video from 1 July 2022.

Reception

Critical response
Samrat Prithviraj received mixed reviews from critics.

Shubhra Gupta of The Indian Express rated the film 2 out of 5 stars and wrote "As befits its simplistic, shorn-of-nuance tone, this Akshay Kumar-Manushi Chhillar film is larger-than-life and stays completely faithful to its stated intent". Saibal Chatterjee of NDTV rated the film 2 out of 5 stars and wrote "A historical drama of this magnitude needed more than just a big budget. It required a sharper eye, a larger vision and a greater degree of integrity, none of which is within its grasp". Anuj Kumar reviewing for The Hindu wrote "Director Chandraprakash Dwivedi’s film seeks to revive cultural nationalism, but doesn’t serve the purpose of those who wish to reap the past for a political harvest". He further said that Akshay Kumar has disappointed in the lead role and that the film "neither does justice to its source nor its subject". Tanul Thakur of The Wire in his review said, "There's absolutely no sense of character or plot progression throughout – people seem like tacky mission statements; subplots are heaps of propagandistic infomercials. There's no sense of intrigue or discovery, turning the entire film into an insufferable road trip".

Tatsam Mukherjee of Firstpost rated the film 1 out of 5 stars and wrote "Samrat Prithviraj unfolds like a straightforward sequence of Wikipedia entries: early childhood, first battle, marriage, second battle, death, legacy". A critic for Pinkvilla rated the film 2.5 out of 5 stars and wrote "Samrat Prithviraj is strictly an average affair, with a rather flat screenplay. The historical is primarily watchable due to three strong sequences:The opening act, the intermission block, and the finale, but the brave Indian warrior deserved a better film. Nairita Mukherjee of India Today rated the film 2.5 out of 5 stars and wrote "If Bollywood's fate rests on Samrat Prithviraj, the future is blank".

Rachana Dubey of The Times of India rated the film 3.5 out of 5 stars and wrote "Samrat Prithviraj is a well-performed and well-directed family drama. It doesn’t have the opulence that we have seen in other historical dramas". Devesh Sharma of Filmfare rated the film 3.5 out of 5 stars and wrote "It’s fondly trying to recreate a time when everything was just and honourable, while also showing that it"s our own disunity which allowed the invaders to step in". A critic for Bollywood Hungama rated the film 3.5 out of 5 stars and wrote "The Akshay Kumar film Samrat Prithviraj is an inspiring and entertaining saga of one of the greatest kings of Indian history". Bohni Bandyopadhyay of News 18 rated the film 3 out of 5 stars and wrote "Akshay Kumar and Manushi Chhillar starrer evokes sentiments of patriotism and Rajput valour, trying to recreate the dramatic love story of Samrat Prithviraj and princess Sanyogita". Deepa Gahlot of Rediff rated the film 3 out of 5 stars and wrote "Akshay Kumar plays the part with enthusiasm, like he was just waiting to get into the costume of a historical hero".

Geeta Pandey of BBC wrote that the film is riddled with historical inaccuracies. Some criticised the movie being made under the BJP government to paint India's Muslim minorities as outsiders and cruel invaders.

Box office
Samrat Prithviraj was released in 5,000 theaters worldwide. It earned  at the domestic box office on its opening day.

The film faced heavy competition from Bhool Bhulaiyaa 2. The morning shows of the film started getting cancelled due to zero occupancy in theaters. The shows that were not cancelled had single-digit occupancy. The Indian Express reported the film having a downward trend and turned out to be a box office flop. The reduction and cancellations of the shows was attributed to the an abundance of screens forcing the occupancy to be low.

After the poor performance theatrically, YRF planned to recover some of the production costs by releasing the film early on Amazon Prime Video, for streaming.

Soundtrack

The film's soundtrack consists of five songs, four of which are composed by Shankar–Ehsaan–Loy while the film score was composed by Sanchit Balhara and Ankit Balhara.

Notes

References

External links 
 
 
 

2020s Hindi-language films
Indian historical action films
Films shot in Rajasthan
Films set in Afghanistan
Films postponed due to the COVID-19 pandemic
Films directed by Chandraprakash Dwivedi
Indian historical drama films
Films about kings
Indian epic films
Indian historical adventure films
War adventure films
War epic films
Films about death
Films based on poems